Harvey L. Allen (September 20, 1888 – February 16, 1957) was an American football player and coach and college president. He served as the head football and basketball coach at Kendall Institute—now known as the University of Tulsa in 1912. Allen later served as the president of the University of Findlay in Ohio and in 1929 as the Chancellor at Kendall.

Head coaching record

Football

References

1888 births
1957 deaths
Basketball coaches from Missouri
Heads of universities and colleges in the United States
Southwestern Oklahoma State Bulldogs football players
Tulsa Golden Hurricane football coaches
Tulsa Golden Hurricane men's basketball coaches
People from Bates County, Missouri
Players of American football from Missouri
20th-century American academics